Eduardo Rincón (born 22 March 1976) is a Colombian former professional tennis player.

Born in 1976, Rincón grew up on a farm near the city of Duitama and is one of five siblings. His elder brother is tennis player Mario Rincón.

As a professional player he competed mostly at satellite and Challenger level, with an ATP Tour main draw appearance at the 1997 Colombian Open, where he lost in the first round to Vince Spadea.

From 1997 to 2001 he was a member of the Colombia Davis Cup team and featured in nine singles rubbers, for wins over Luis Horna (Peru), Roger Smith (Bahamas) and Pablo Bianchi (Uruguay).

Rincón, a two-time All-American at Valdosta State, now works as a coach in collegiate tennis.

ITF Futures titles

Doubles: (1)

References

External links
 
 
 

1976 births
Living people
Colombian male tennis players
Valdosta State University alumni
College men's tennis players in the United States
Sportspeople from Boyacá Department
20th-century Colombian people
21st-century Colombian people